mod_parrot is an optional module for the Apache web server. It embeds a Parrot virtual machine interpreter into the Apache server and provides access to the Apache API to allow handlers to be written in Parrot assembly language, or any high-level language targeted to Parrot.

External links
 
 
 

Parrot
Perl
Articles with underscores in the title